Žumberak is a village and a municipality in Croatia in the Zagreb County. The municipal centre is located in the village of Kostanjevac.

Žumberak together with the Samobor Mountains form a nature park. Žumberak is a karst area with beech and chestnut forests. Many residents of Žumberak at the end of the 19th century immigrated to Slovenia, Austria and Germany because of grapevine phylloxera. Nowadays, rural tourism, wine production and viticulture have developed in Žumberak.  

Settlements are:

 Cernik, population 11
 Donji Oštrc, population 72
 Drašći Vrh, population 22
 Đurašin, population 22
 Glušinja, population 22
 Gornji Oštrc, population 57
 Grgetići, population 0
 Grič, population 14
 Hartje, population 34
 Javor, population 10
 Jezernice, population 0
 Jurkovo Selo, population 66
 Kalje, population 17
 Kordići Žumberački, population 5
 Kostanjevac, population 121
 Kupčina Žumberačka, population 39
 Markušići, population 6
 Mrzlo Polje Žumberačko, population 41
 Petričko Selo, population 18
 Plavci, population 5
 Radinovo Brdo, population 9
 Reštovo Žumberačko, population 14
 Sopote, population 3
 Sošice, population 77
 Stari Grad Žumberački, population 2
 Stupe, population 31
 Tomaševci, population 10
 Tupčina, population 49
 Veliki Vrh, population 11
 Visoće, population 24
 Višći Vrh, population 16
 Vlašić Brdo, population 2
 Vukovo Brdo, population 12
 Žamarija, population 22
 Željezno Žumberačko, population 34
 Žumberak, population 6

References

 Where is Zumberak on map?

Populated places in Zagreb County
Municipalities of Croatia